Igor Musa (born 18 October 1973, Jajce, Bosnia and Herzegovina) is a Croatian retired central midfielder.

Career
Born in Jajce, but raised in Bugojno, Musa started his career with Velež Mostar.
He went to Hajduk from Slaven Belupo in the summer of 2006 and then to AEL Limassol in July 2007. He was in Hajduk previously in 2001/2002. At end of the season his contract expired and he left for Spanish club Xerez. In 2016, the State Attorney in Split confirmed that it started cooperating with Interpol in investigating that transfer, in which 300,000 euros allegedly disappeared.

He finished his professional football career in his favourite club HŠK Zrinjski Mostar.

Honours
Velež Mostar
Yugoslav Cup: 1986

Hrvatski Dragovoljac
Druga HNL (West): 1994–95

Hajduk Split
Prva HNL: 2000–01
Croatian Cup: 2000

Zrinjski Mostar
Premier League of Bosnia and Herzegovina: 2008–09

References

External links
 
Igor Musa profile at Nogometni Magazin 
Igor Musa profile

Profile at HNS (Croatian FA) 

1973 births
Living people
People from Jajce
People from Bugojno
Croats of Bosnia and Herzegovina
Association football midfielders
Yugoslav footballers
Croatian footballers
Croatia under-21 international footballers
FK Velež Mostar players
NK GOŠK Dubrovnik players
NK Samobor players
NK Hrvatski Dragovoljac players
HNK Rijeka players
HNK Hajduk Split players
Xerez CD footballers
NK Slaven Belupo players
AEL Limassol players
HŠK Zrinjski Mostar players
Yugoslav First League players
Croatian Football League players
Segunda División players
Cypriot First Division players
Premier League of Bosnia and Herzegovina players
Croatian expatriate footballers
Expatriate footballers in Spain
Croatian expatriate sportspeople in Spain
Expatriate footballers in Cyprus
Croatian expatriate sportspeople in Cyprus
Expatriate footballers in Bosnia and Herzegovina
Croatian expatriate sportspeople in Bosnia and Herzegovina